Almirante Juan de Borbón (F-102) is the second ship of the new F-100 class of air defence frigates entering service with the Spanish Navy in 2003. She is named for Infante Juan de Borbón, Count of Barcelona, father of the former King of Spain, Juan Carlos I.

History 

 September 8, 2006 - Departs from Rota to escort the Spanish troops en route to Lebanon
 November 12, 2006 - Arrives at Rota, returning from Lebanon without incident
 February 2007 - Participates in GALIBER 07 Exercises
 March 2007 - Returns to port
 May 2007 - Sails for trials at Cartagena
 June 2007 - Sails to Norway (Stavanger) and Greece (Chania and Heraklion) returning to base by the end of the month
 January 2008 - Sails to Cádiz and is forced back by malfunction, expending some time in repairs.
 April 2008 - Sails to Brest (France) to perform combat qualification with the French Navy
 June 2008 - Sails to Estonia and returns in December of the same year
 January 2010 - Sails to Portugal and Cádiz
 May–June 2010 - Sails to perform combat qualifications
 January 12, 2011 - Arrives at Naval Station Norfolk, Virginia, prior to the warship's participation with Carrier Strike Group Two during its Composite Unit Training Exercise (COMPTUEX) and Joint Task Force Exercise (JTFEX) underway period.

Specifications 
 Builder: Izar, Astillero Ferrol
 Propulsion: 2 × General Electric LM2500 gas turbines, 2 × Caterpillar 3600 diesel engines
 Shafts: 2 (Wärtsilä controllable pitch propellers)
 Length: 146.7 m (482 ft)
 Beam: 18.6 m (61 ft)
 Draught: 4.75 (15 ft)
 Displacement: 5,800 tons (full load)
 Speed: 28.5 knots (52+ km/h)
 Range: 4500 NM
 Cost: 600 million €
 Crew: 250 (48 officers)
 Armament:
 1 × 5-inch/54 Mk45 Mod 2 gun
 2 × CIWS FABA 20mm/120 Meroka gun
 6 × Mk41 8-cell VLS
 SAM: 32 × Standard SM-2 Block IIIA
 SAM: 64 × RIM-162 Evolved Sea Sparrow Missile
 SSM: 8 × McDonnell Douglas RGM-84 Harpoon anti-ship missile
 ASW: 4 × 324 mm Mk32 Mod 9 triple Torpedo launchers with 12 Honeywell Mk46 mod 5 Torpedo
 Helicopter:
 1 × Sikorsky SH-60B LAMPS III Seahawk
 Electronics
 Sonar: ENOSA-Raytheon DE 1160LF (I)
 Radar: Lockheed Martin AN/SPY-1D 3-D multifunction
 Surface Radar: Raytheon SPS-67(V)4
 Weapon Control: Aegis combat system, 2 × Raytheon SPG-62 Mk99 radar illuminator, 1 × FABA DORNA fire control
 Navigation: Thales Scout
 Countermeasures
 4 × FMC SRBOC Mk36 flare launchers
 SLQ-25A Enhanced Nixie  torpedo countermeasures
 ESM/ECM: Indra SLQ-380
 CESELSA Elnath Mk 9000 interceptor

Notes

External links

Frigates
Frigates of the Spanish Navy
Ships built in Spain
2002 ships